Clinidium poinari is a species of ground beetle in the subfamily Rhysodinae. It was described by Ross Bell & J.R. Bell in 2009 and named after entomologist George Poinar Jr. The description was based on two male specimens in amber from the Dominican Republic.

References

Clinidium
Beetles described in 2009
Fossil taxa described in 2009